Dianthus pavonius, the peacock-eye pink, is a herbaceous perennial plant of the genus Dianthus of the family Caryophyllaceae.

Etymology
The genus name Dianthus derives from the Greek words for divine ("dios") and flower ("anthos"), while the species name pavonius comes from the Latin "pavo" and means "like a peacock".

Description

Dianthus pavonius is a hemicryptophyte scapose plant reaching  in height. This short-stemmed carnation occurs in dense clumps. It has bluish-greenish pointed leaves and purple-pink coloured flowers, with a blue or brown heart. The flowering period extends from April through May. The fruits are cylindrical capsules with several flat brown seeds.

Distribution
This species is mainly present in the southern Alps in France and Italy and in the Pyrenees.

Habitat

Gallery

References

External links
 The Seed Site
 Botany.cz

pavonius
Flora of the Pyrenees
Flora of the Alps